The 1937 Workers' Summer Olympiad was the sixth edition of International Workers' Olympiads. The games were held from 25 July to 1 August at Antwerp in Belgium. They were originally planned for Barcelona 1936, but cancelled due to the outbreak of the Spanish Civil War.

1937 Olympiad was a joint event with the Red Sport International organized Spartakiads. It was the first time as a delegation from Soviet Union took part at the Workers' Olympiad. German athletes no longer participated since the Workers' Gymnastics and Sports Federation of Germany had been banned by the Nazi regime in 1933.

Sports 
Athletics
Basketball
Basque pelota
Boxing
Chess
Cycling
Field handball
Football
Gymnastics
Motor cycling
Swimming
Table tennis
Tennis
Tug of War
Volleyball
Water polo
Weightlifting
Wrestling

Nations table

Points: Gold medal: 4 points, Silver medal: 3 points, Bronze medal: 2 points, 4th place: 1 point

Source:

Notable winners 
  Moisey Kasyanik, weightlifting (60 kg)
  Mikhail Kasyanik, gymnastics
  Nikolay Korolyov, heavyweight boxing
  Väinö Leskinen, 200 and 400 meter breaststroke swimming
  Seraphim Znamensky, 5,000 meters run
  Spartak Moscow, football

References 

International Workers' Olympiads
Workers' Summer Olympiad
Sports competitions in Antwerp
International sports competitions hosted by Belgium
Workers' Summer Olympiad
Multi-sport events in Belgium
1930s in Antwerp
Workers' Summer Olympiad
Workers' Summer Olympiad